Wenecja  (German Venedien) is a village in the administrative district of Gmina Morąg, within Ostróda County, Warmian-Masurian Voivodeship, in northern Poland.

The village has a population of 280. Its name is the Polish word for Venice.

References

Wenecja